"Nail Tech" is a song by American rapper Jack Harlow, released on February 18, 2022, through labels Atlantic Records and Generation Now. The song was produced by Boi-1da, Rogét Chahayed, Jahaan Sweet, Coleman, Babetruth, and Fierce, with extra production by American singer-songwriter John Mayer. It is the lead single from Harlow's second album Come Home the Kids Miss You, released on May 6, 2022.

Personnel
 Songwriters: Jackman Harlow, Matthew Samuels,  Rogét Chahayed, Jahaan Sweet, Scotty Coleman, José Velazquez, Amir Sims, Douglas Ford, Montez Jones
 Producers: Boi-1da, Rogét Chahayed, Jahaan Sweet, Rogét Coleman, BabeTruth, Fierce
 Additional producer: John Mayer
 Mixing engineers: Nickie Jon Pabón, Patrizio "Teezio" Pigliapoco
 Assistant mix engineer: Ignacio Portales
 Recording engineer: Nickie Jon Pabón
 Trumpet and Trombone: Ryan Svendsen

Charts

Weekly charts

Year-end charts

Certifications

Release history

References

2022 singles
2022 songs
Jack Harlow songs
Atlantic Records singles
Song recordings produced by Boi-1da
Songs written by Boi-1da
Songs written by Jack Harlow
Songs written by Rogét Chahayed